The Thursday Murder Club is the debut novel by Pointless and House of Games presenter Richard Osman. It was published on 3 September 2020 by Viking Press, a subsidiary of Penguin Random House.

Plot
A group of pensioners (Elizabeth Best; Ron Ritchie; Joyce Meadowcroft; and Ibrahim Arif) set about solving the mystery of the murder of a property developer in the luxurious Cooper's Chase retirement village near the fictitious village of Fairhaven in Kent.

Publication
Osman's inspiration for the book came from a visit he made to an upmarket retirement village. He wrote the book over 18 months in secret.

After a 10-way publishing auction, Penguin Random House acquired the rights to The Thursday Murder Club and its sequel The Man Who Died Twice for a seven-figure sum in 2019.

The book was published on 3 September 2020. It sold 45,000 copies in its first three days on sale and became a Sunday Times number one bestseller. As of 8 September, it had been sold in 16 countries. In the week leading up to 19 December, it sold 134,514 copies, making it the first debut novel ever to be Christmas number one.

Reception
In The Times, Christina Hardyment said the book has an "ingenious plot".

The Guardian described it as the "fastest selling adult crime debut" in recorded history.

Adaptations
The book was adapted for BBC Radio 4 and broadcast in early 2021, read by Haydn Gwynne.

Steven Spielberg's production company Amblin Entertainment bought the book's global film rights. The film will be written and directed by Ol Parker.

Sequels
Book number two of the series, The Man Who Died Twice, was released on 16 September 2021, and a third book, The Bullet That Missed, was released in September 2022.

References

2020 British novels
British crime novels
Viking Press books
Novels set in Kent
2020 debut novels